Prasanna Gunawardenais a former mayor of Colombo and a former presidential adviser. He is a Charted Architect and urban planner by profession.

Personal life
Born 23 August 1946 as son of Philip Gunawardena and Kusuma Amarasinha, and brother of Indika (ex-cabinet minister), Lakmali (State Award Winner of literature), Dinesh (cabinet minister and leader of the house – Parliament), and Gitanjana (ex-minister).

See also
Philip Gunawardena
Dinesh Gunawardena
List of political families in Sri Lanka

References

External links
The Gunawardena Ancestry

Alumni of Royal College, Colombo
Living people
Mayors of Colombo
Sinhalese architects
Sinhalese politicians
Year of birth missing (living people)